Connor Budarick (born 4 April 2001) is an Australian rules footballer playing for the Gold Coast Football Club in the Australian Football League (AFL).

Early life
Budarick was born in South Australia and spent the early years of his life in the small crayfishing town of Robe before relocating to Queensland's Gold Coast at the age of 9. His father, Craig, was a professional Australian rules footballer who initially played for Glenelg in the SANFL where he kicked 150 goals in 66 games and was drafted to the Sydney Swans with pick 110 in the 1989 national draft. Connor played his junior football for the Labrador Tigers and joined the Gold Coast Suns developmental academy at 12 years of age. He made his NEAFL debut for Southport at 16 years of age and became a regular selection for the Gold Coast Suns reserves team in 2018. Budarick attended Helensvale State High School throughout his teenage years and was given a scholarship to enter the school's AFL Sport of Excellence programme.

Leading into his 2019 junior season, Budarick was named captain of the Suns academy team and was awarded the Hunter Harrison Medal for the top performing academy player in the NAB League. He was then selected to represent the Allies at the 2019 AFL Under 18 Championships where his performances earned him All-Australian selection. Budarick was drafted to the Gold Coast Suns as an academy pre-listed player in October 2019. Budarick has stated he grew up supporting the Suns in his younger years.

AFL career
Budarick made his AFL debut at 18 years of age against Port Adelaide in Round 1 of the 2020 AFL season. He was awarded the round 3 AFL Rising Star nomination for his brilliant defensive performance against the Adelaide Crows, which included 16 disposals, six marks and his first AFL goal.

Statistics
 Statistics are correct to the end of round 16 2022

|- style="background-color: #EAEAEA"
! scope="row" style="text-align:center" | 2020
|
| 35 || 15 || 1 || 0 || 92 || 46 || 138 || 35 || 25 || 0.1 || 0.0 || 6.1 || 3.1 || 9.2 || 2.3 || 1.7
|-
! scope="row" style="text-align:center" | 2021
|
| 35 || 2 || 0 || 0 || 19 || 9 || 28 || 11 || 4 || 0.0 || 0.0 || 9.5 || 4.5 || 14.0 || 5.5 || 2.0
|- style="background-color: #EAEAEA"
! scope="row" style="text-align:center" | 2022
|
| 35 || 9 || 0 || 1 || 106 || 29 || 135 || 44 || 22 || 0.0 || 0.1 || 11.7 || 3.2 || 15.0 || 4.8 || 2.4
|- class="sortbottom"
! colspan=3| Career
! 26
! 1
! 1
! 217
! 84
! 301
! 89
! 51
! 0.0
! 0.0
! 8.3
! 3.2
! 11.5
! 3.4
! 1.9
|}

References

External links

2001 births
Australian rules footballers from Queensland
Gold Coast Football Club players
Sportspeople from the Gold Coast, Queensland
Living people
Labrador Australian Football Club players
People from South Australia